This is a list of programs broadcast by ABS-CBN, a Philippine television network. The network is headquartered in ABS-CBN Broadcasting Center, Diliman, Quezon City. 

On May 5, 2020, ABS-CBN was issued a cease-and-desist order by the National Telecommunications Commission (NTC) and Solicitor General Jose Calida, after the NTC refused to renew the network's franchise license earlier in February 2020. The franchise license expired on May 4, 2020, and a day later, ABS-CBN officially signed off in the evening. On July 10, 2020, the House Committee of 18th Congress rejected the franchise renewal of ABS-CBN. As a result, the network was forced to cease operations of some of its divisions and laid off its workers on August 31, 2020. 

Kapamilya Channel and A2Z replaces ABS-CBN (including its flagship terrestrial television station, DWWX-TV Channel 2 in Manila, now operating as DZMV-TV Channel 2) and can be viewed via terrestrial television (DZOE-TV Channel 11) on analog free TV in Manila, DYPR-TV Channel 12 in Tacloban, and Channel 20 on digital TV nationwide), cable, satellite and online. A2Z is a blocktime agreement between ABS-CBN Corporation and ZOE Broadcasting Network.

Original programming
Note: Titles are listed in alphabetical order, followed by the year of debut in parentheses.

News
4 na Sulok ng Daigdig (1967–1972)
ABS-CBN Breaking News (2000–2005)
ABS-CBN Headlines (2000–2003)
ABS-CBN Insider (2003–2006)
ABS-CBN International Report (1986–1990)
ABS-CBN News Advisory (1986–2005)
Alas Singko Y Medya (1996–2002)
Alas Singko Y Medya Weekend (1999–2002)
Balita Alas Singko ng Umaga (2000–2001)
Balita Atbp. (2001-2002)
Balita Ngayon (1967–1972, 1986–1987)
Bandila (2006–2020)
Encounter (1969)
Gising Pilipinas (2008–2012)
Global News (1998–2001)
Good Morning, Philippines (1986)
Junior Patrol (1990–1992)
Kabayan (2010, 2020)
Kape't Salita (2018–2020)
Magandang Umaga (1986–1988)
Magandang Umaga, Bayan (2002–2005)
Magandang Umaga, Bayan Weekend (2002–2004)
Magandang Umaga, Pilipinas (2005–2007)
Magandang Umaga Po (1988–1991)
Nescafé Morning News (1987–1989)
News Patrol (2005–2020)
Newsbreak (1967–1972)
Pulso: Aksyon Balita (1999–2000)
The Weekend News (1996–2005)
Todo Balita (2008–2010)
TV Patrol (1987–2020)
TV Patrol Linggo (2004–2010)
TV Patrol Sabado (2004–2010)
TV Patrol Weekend (2010–2020)
TV Patrol World (2004–2010)
Umagang Kay Ganda (2007–2020)
The World Tonight (1966–1972, 1986–1999; Weekend Edition, 1987–1996)

Current affairs
ABS-CBN News and Current Affairs Special Report (2011)
ABS-CBN Special News Report (1990)
Ako Ang Simula (2011–2013)
Bahay Kalinga (1988–1991)
Bantay Bata, The Series (2000)
Barangay Dos (2000–2001)
Bayan Ko, Sagot Ko (1994–1996)
The Bottomline with Boy Abunda (2009–2020)
Business and Leisure (1991–1998)
Business and Pleasure (1986–1987)
Cafe Bravo (1989–1990)
Chicken, Pork, Atbp. (2002–2003)
Citiline (1994–1999)
Compañero y Compañera (1997–1998)
Damayan (1969–1972)
Dong Puno Live (1995–2000, 2003–2005)
Dong Puno Tonight (2003–2004)
E.T.C. (2002–2003)
Earthlink (1996–1997)
Good Morning! Philippines (1986)
Gus Abelgas: Nag-Uulat (2002–2003)
Gym Team (1992–1998)
Harapan (2008)
Hoy Gising! (1992–2001)
Hoy Gising! Kapamilya (2004–2005)
Impact with Max Soliven (1971–1972, 2004)
The Inside Story (1990–1998)
Isyu (2002–2003)
Isyu 101 (2000–2002)
Kabalikat, Loren Legarda (2001)
Kabuhayan Muna (1987)
Kalye, Mga Kwento ng Lansangan (2008–2009)
Katapat, Fred Lim (1998–2001)
Kontrapelo (2000–2001)
Kontrobersyal (2003–2006)
Krusada (2010–2013)
Kulilits (2009–2010)
Loren (1999–2001)
Lukso ng Dugo (2004)
Malacañang This Week (1987)
Manila, Manila (1988–1989)
Mga Kasaysayan sa Likod ng TV Patrol (1989)
MIB: Mga Imbestigador ng Bayan (1999)
Mission X (2001–2003)
Morning Info Specials (1987–1989)
Mukha (2014–2015)
Nagmamahal, Kapamilya (2006–2007)
Noypi! Ikaw Ba 'To? (2006–2008)
Off the Record (2001–2003)
Options (1991–1993)
Overseas Unlimited (1986)
Payong Kapatid (2005–2006)
Pinoy Exposèd (2000–2001)
Private I (2003–2005)
Sapul Kayo Diyan! (2001–2002)
Simpleng Hiling (2003–2004)
Special Assignment (2002–2004)
Storyline (2010–2013)
True Crime (2001–2002)
Two for the Road (1967–1972)
Usapang Business (1996–1999)
Verum EST: Totoo Ba Ito? (2001)
Willingly Yours (2002–2003)

News magazine
3-in-1 (2015)
Assignment (1995–2001)
Balitang K (1996–2001)
Balitang Kris (2001)
Bistado (2012–2015)
Demandahan (2012–2013)
Engkwentro (2012–2013)
F! (1999–2006)
Failon Ngayon (2009–2020)
G Diaries (2017–2020)
Hiwaga (2012–2014)
Kuha Mo! (2019–2020)
Local Legends (2019–2020)
Magandang Gabi... Bayan (1988–2005)
Mga Kwento ni Marc Logan (2014–2017)
Mission Possible (2015–2020)
Mutya ng Masa (2013–2015)
My Puhunan (2013–2020)
#NoFilter (2019–2020)
Rated K (2004–2020)
ReailTV (2015)
Red Alert (2014–2019)
Pareng Partners (2018–2019)
PEP (People, Events and Places) Talk (1986–1990)
Saklolo (2012–2013)
Sports Unlimited (1997–2020)
Tatak Pilipino (1990–1995)
TNT: Tapatan ni Tunying (2013–2019)
Usapang Business (1996–1999)
Wonder Mom (2008–2009)

Documentary
The Correspondents (1998–2010)
Patrol ng Pilipino (2010–2013)
Pipol (1999–2006)
Probe (1987–1988; 2005–2009)
Probe Profiles (2009–2010)
S.I.M. Scandals, Intrigues, Mysteries (2001)
S.O.C.O.: Scene of the Crime Operatives (2005–2020)
Trip na Trip (2006–2011)
XXX: Exklusibong, Explosibong, Exposé (2006–2013)

Drama

Anthology
Bantay Bata, The Series (2000)
Bayani (1995–2001)
Bedtime Stories (1988)
Calvento Files (1995–1998)
Coney Reyes on Camera (1989–1998)
Discovery Drama Theater (1988–1991)
Family Theater (1960–1972)
Flames (1996–2002)
Give Love on Christmas (2014–2015)
I Am KC (2008)
Ipaglaban Mo! (2014–2020)
Japayuki (1992–1993)
Judy Ann Drama Special (1999–2001)
Kabalikat, Loren Legarda (2001–2002)
Kapag May Katwiran, Ipaglaban Mo! (1992–1999)
Katapat, Mayor Fred Lim (1998–2001)
Love Spell (2006–2008)
Maalaala Mo Kaya (1991–2020)
The Maricel Drama Special (1989–1997)
Maricel Regal Drama Special (1987–1989)
Mga Kasaysayan Sa Likod Ng TV Patrol (1989)
Mga Lihim ng Ermita (1992–1993)
Mr. Cupido (1992–1995)
Nagmamahal, Kapamilya (2006–2007)
Nagmamahal Pa Rin Sa Iyo (1999)
Napakasakit, Kuya Eddie (1986–1988)
Nora (1993)
Oro Mismo
Pangarap at Tagumpay, Mga Kuwento Sa Likod ng Wowowee (2006)
Regal Drama Presents (1986–1989)
Sa Sandaling Kailangan Mo Ako (1998–1999)
Sandara's Romance (2004–2005)
Seiko TV Presents (1989–1990)
Star Drama Presents (1993–2001)
Star Magic Presents (2006–2008)
Star Studio Presents (2000–2003)
Stop Child Abuse
Tanging Yaman, The Series (2002–2003)
Tara Tena (2003–2004)
Weekend Love (2004)
Your Song: (2006–2011)

Fantasy and horror
Agimat: Ang Mga Alamat ni Ramon Revilla (2009–2011)
Hiwaga sa Bahay na Bato (1963)
Hiwaga ng Kambat (2019)
Komiks Presents: (2006–2009)
Kapitan Boom (2008)
Varga (2008)
Tiny Tony (2008)
Dragonna (2008–2009)
Flash Bomba (2009)
Nasaan Ka Maruja? (2009)
The Haunted (2019–2020)
Mga Bayani sa Kalawakan (1962–1963)
Nginiig (2004–2006)
!Oka Tokat (1997–2002)
Oka2kat (2012)
Pangitain (1963)
Pinoy Fantasy (1988–1989)
Parasite Island (2019)
Super Inggo 1.5: Ang Bagong Bangis (2007)
Volta (2008)
Wansapanataym (1997–2005, 2006–2007, 2010–2019)
WansapanaSummer (2013–2015)

Comedy
Aalog-Alog (2006–2007)
Abangan Ang Susunod Na Kabanata (1991–1997)
Ang Bagong Buhay Artista (1972)
Ang Mahiwagang Daigdig ni Doray (1965–1970)
Ang Tanging Ina (2003–2005)
Ang TV (1992–1997)
Arriba, Arriba! (2000–2003)
Attagirl (2001–2002)
Banana Nite (2013–2015)
Banana Split (2008–2011)
Banana Split Daily Servings (2009–2011)
Banana Split Laffternoon Delight (2011)
Banana Split Extra Scoop (2011–2015)
Banana Sundae (2015–2020)
Barrio Balimbing (1987–1988)
Bida si Mister, Bida si Misis (2002–2005)
Bigay-Hilig (1969–1972)
Bora: Sons of the Beach (2005–2006)
Budoy (1989)
Buhay Artista (1965–1972)
Bulagaan (1989–1993)
Bulagaan University (1993–1995)
Cafeteria Aroma (1969–1972)
Chika Chika Chicks (1987–1991)
Da Body en da Guard (2001)
Da Pilya en da Pilot (2001–2002)
Darigold Jamboree (1958–1964)
Dok Ricky, Pedia (2017–2020)
Ellas A.D. (1989–1990)
Eto Na Ang Susunod Na Kabanata (2001)
Executive Champoy (1992)
George and Cecil (2009–2010)
Goin' Bananas (1987–1991)
Goin' Bulilit (2005–2019)
Gudtaym (2006)
Home Along Da Airport (2003–2005)
Home Along Da Riles (1992–2003)
Home Sweetie Home (2014–2020)
It Bulingit (1990–1991)
John en Shirley (2006–2007)
Ka-Pete Na! Totally Outrageous Behavior (2007–2008)
Kaya ni Mister, Kaya ni Misis (1997–2001)
Klasmeyts (2002–2003)
Laugh Out Loud (2010–2011)
Let's Go Crazy with Jack & Joey (1986–1989)
Luv Ko si Kris (1990–1993)
Luv U (2012–2016)
M3: Malay Mo Ma-develop (2010)
Mana (1992–1993)
Mana-Mana (1993)
Mary D' Potter (2001–2002)
Mga Kwento ni Lola (1987)
Mommy Ko, Daddy Ko! (1986–1987)
My Family Three (1970)
My Juan and Only (2005–2006)
OK Fine, Oh Yes! (2006)
OK Fine, 'To Ang Gusto Nyo! (2004–2006)
OK Fine, Whatever! (2002–2004)
Okay Ka, Fairy Ko! (1989–1995)
Oki Doki Doc (1993–2000)
Onli In Da Pilipins (1997–1998)
Palibhasa Lalake (1987–1998)
Parak (1986–1987)
Parekoy (2009)
Pwedeng Pwede (1999–2001)
Quizon Avenue (2005–2006)
Richard Loves Lucy: Sweetie Pie, Honey Pie (1998–2001)
Sine Sine (1988)
Small Brothers (1990–1991)
Spice Boys (1997)
Super Laff-In (1969–1972, 1996–1999)
Tang-Tarang-Tang (1966–1972)
Tarajing Potpot (1999–2000)
Tayo’y Mag-Hapi-Hapi (1969–1972)
That's My Doc (2007–2008)
Toda Max (2011–2013)
VidJoking (2005)
Wala Kang Paki (1990)
Wanbol High (1987)
Whattamen (2001–2004)
Yes, Yes Show! (2004–2006)

Informative
At Home Ka Dito (2004–2007)
At Home with Nora (1966–1972)
Busog Lusog (2008–2009)
Citiline (1994–1999)
Cooking Atbp. (1989–1990)
Cooking It Up with Nora (1989–1992)
Cooking With the Dazas (1992–1995)
Del Monte Kitchenomics (1989–1995, 2000–2004)
Del Monte Quick 'n Easy Presents: Annebisyosa Sa Kusina! (2013)
F! (1999–2003)
Feel at Home (2000–2004)
Hiraya Manawari (1995–2003)
Knorr Kitchenhood Diaries (2013)
Knowledge Power (1998–2004)
Kumikitang Kabuhayan (2003–2005)
Makuha Ka sa Tikim (2005–2006)
Matanglawin (2008–2020)
Perfect Moments (2005)
Salamat Dok (2004–2020)
San Miguel Purefoods: Kwentong Kusina, Kwentong Buhay (2013)
Sarap TV (1998–2002)
Sine'skwela (1994–2004, 2009–2010)
Swak na Swak (2006–2020)
Urban Zone (2006–2012)

Kid-oriented
ATBP: Awit, Titik at Bilang na Pambata (1994–1998)
Art Jam (2004–2006)
Basta Sports (2006)
Batibot (1991–1994)
Chikiting Patrol (1988–1990)
Children's Hour (1986–1988)
Detek Kids (2003–2004)
Eh Kasi Bata! (1991–1994)
Epol/Apple (1999–2004)
For Kids Only (1992–2000)
I Got It! (2010–2012)
It Bulingit (1990–1991)
Jollitown (2011–2012)
Kabataan Xpress (2006–2007)
Kulilits (2009–2010)
MathDali (2016–2018)
Math-Tinik (1997–2004, 2009–2010)
Oyayi (2016–2017)
Pahina (2000–2001)
Salam (2006–2007; re-aired on Holy Week 2008)
Silip; Sining sa Lipunan (2004)
Sine'skwela (1994–2004, 2009–2010)
Sirit (2007)
Star Smile Factory (1987–1992)
TV Kinderland (1964–1972)
Why Not? (2011–2013; re-aired 2015–2017)
Yan ang Bata (1993–1995)
Yes To Christmas (2006–2007)

Reality
Be Bench / The Model Search (2007)
The Biggest Loser Pinoy Edition (2011, 2014)
Born Diva (2004–2005)
Close Up to Fame, The Search for the Next Close Up Couple (2005–2006)
Dance Kids (2015–2016)
Del Monte Got2BFit Challenge (2008)
Gaby's Xtraordinary Files (2008)
Hamon sa Kampeon
I Can Do That (2017)
I Can See Your Voice (2017–2020)
I Dare You (2011, 2013)
I Do (2014)
I Love OPM (2016)
Idol Philippines (2019)
Junior MasterChef Pinoy Edition (2011–2012)
Kakasa Ka Ba? (2002)
Kamao: Matirang Matibay (2005)
Kaya Mo Ba 'To? (2004–2005)
The Kids' Choice (2018)
Little Big Shots (2017)
Little Big Star (2005–2007)
Little Big Superstar (2007)
MasterChef Pinoy Edition (2012–2013)
Melason (2010)
Palmolive Shining Circle Of 10 Batch 2008 (2008)
Pilipinas Got More Talent (2010)
Pilipinas Got Talent (2010–2018)
Pinoy Big Brother (2005–2020)
Pinoy Boyband Superstar (2016)
Pinoy Dream Academy (2006–2008)
Pinoy Fear Factor (2008–2009)
Pinoy Mano Mano: Celebrity Boxing Challenge (2007–2008)
Pirated CD, Celebrity Disguise (2004)
Promil Pre-School I Shine Talent Camp TV (2012–2014)
Qpids (2005)
Real Pinoy Fighter (2006–2007)
Sapul Kayo D'yan! (2001–2002)
The Search for the Next White Castle Girl (2007)
Search for the Star in a Million (2005–2006)
Star Circle Quest (2004–2011)
Star Hunt: The Grand Audition Show (2018-2020)
Star in a Million (2003–2004)
Star Power: The Next Female Pop Superstar (2010–2011)
StarDance (2005)
Talents Unlimited (1987–1988)
Tawag ng Tanghalan (1953–1972, 1987–1988)
To The Max (2004)
Trip Kita, The Search for the Next Colgate Endorser (2004)
U Can Dance (2006–2007)
Victim (2003–2005)
The Voice Kids (2014–2019)
The Voice of the Philippines (2013–2015)
The Voice Teens (2017–2020)
We Love OPM (2016)
World of Dance Philippines (2019)
The X Factor Philippines (2012)
Your Face Sounds Familiar (2015–2018)

Game
1 vs. 100 (2007–2008)
ABS-CBN & Unilever: Pamilyong Papremyo sa Pamilya (1999)
Bet on Your Baby (2013–2015, 2017)
Celebrity Playtime (2015–2016)
Family Feud (2016–2017)
Family Kuarta o Kahon (1962–1972)
Game KNB? (2001–2009)
Game ng Bayan (2016)
Game Na Game (1988)
Game Na Game Na! (1994–1996)
Games Uplate Live (2006–2009)
Kapamilya, Deal or No Deal (2006–2009, 2012–2013, 2015–2016)
Kapamilya Games Uplate (2006–2007)
Minute to Win It (2013–2014, 2016–2017, 2019)
Panahon Ko 'to!: Ang Game Show ng Buhay Ko (2010)
PBB: What's The Word That's The Word (2005–2006)
Pinoy Bingo Night (2009)
The Price is Right (2011)
Ready, Get Set, Go! (1991–1997)
The Singing Bee (2008–2010, 2013–2015)
Smart Amazing Dreams (2002–2003)
Twist and Shout (2010)
Wheel of Fortune (2008)

Talk
Aquino & Abunda Tonight (2014–2015)
The Baby O' Brien Show (1963–1972)
Bar None (1986)
Boy & Kris (2007–2009)
Buhay Artista (1965–1972)
The Buzz (1999–2015)
Cafe Bravo (1989–1990)
Cinemascoop (1988)
Cristy Per Minute (1995–2000)
Dina (1988–1989)
Dong Puno Live (1995–2000, 2003–2005)
Dong Puno Tonight (2003–2004)
EK Channel (2004–2005)
Entertainment Konek (2005–2006)
Entertainment Live (2007–2012)
Gandang Gabi, Vice! (2011–2020)
Good Morning, Kris (2004)
Homeboy (2005–2007)
Julie (1997–2001)
Kris & Tell (2001)
Kris TV (2011–2016)
Mag-Usap Tayo, Bayan
Magandang Buhay (2016–2023)
Martin After Dark (1993–1998)
Martin Late @ Night (2013)
Martin Late at Nite (1998–2003)
Mel & Jay (1989–1996)
Misis of the 80's (1987–1988)
Monday Night with Edu (1987)
Morning Girls (2002–2003)
Morning Girls with Kris and Korina (2003–2004)
Morning Star (2004–2005)
Morning Treats (1988–1989)
Not So Late Night With Edu (1987–1989)
Oh No! It's Johnny! (1987–1999)
Ruffa & Ai (2009)
Rumors: Facts and Humors (1987–1988)
S2: Showbiz Sabado (2003)
Sharon (1998–2004, 2006–2010)
Showbiz Inside Report (2012–2013)
Showbiz Lingo (1992–1997)
Showbiz Lingo Plus (1997–1999)
Showbiz na Showbiz (1986–1987)
Showbiz Number 1 (2004–2005)
Simply KC (2010)
Sine Sine (1988)
SNN: Showbiz News Ngayon (2009–2011)
Talk TV (2001–2002)
Teysi (2003–2004)
Teysi ng Tahanan (1991–1997)
Today with Kris Aquino (1996–2001)
Tonight with Boy Abunda (2015–2020)
Y-Speak (2004–2005)

Variety/musical
Afternoon Delight (1987–1989)
Always, Snooky (1987–1988)
American School Night
ASAP (1995–2020)
Bigay-Hilig (1966–1968)
Caltex Star Caravan
Coke Studio Philippines (2018–2019)
Chelsea Dancetime
Dance-2-Nite (1987–1988)
Eat Bulaga! (1989–1995)
The Eddie and Nova Plus (1969–1972)
The Eddie Ilarde Show (1959–1962)
Esep Esep! (1999)
Everyday Holiday (1968–1970)
The Gloria-Luis Show
Gwapings Live! (1992)
Happy Yipee Yehey! (2011–2012)
In da Loop (2012)
In TUX icating (1986)
It's Showtime (2009–2020)
Keep on Dancing (1998–2001)
Lots of Catch (1986)
Loveli-Ness (1987–1988)
M.R.S. (Most Requested Show) (2005)
Magandang Tanghali (1965–1968)
Magpasikat (2010)
Martin and Pops Twogether (1987–1988)
MTB (1998–2005)
Music Uplate Live (2010–2011)
Na-Kuh Eh, Eto nAPO Sila! (1987)
The Nestor and Nida Show (1964–1972)
Nestle Special (1986–1987)
The New Silver Swan Sunday Show
Nine-Teeners (1986–1987)
On With The Show (1970–1972)
Oras ng Ligaya (1965–1971)
Pangarap na Bituin (1991)
Pilipinas Win Na Win (2010)
Pista ng Bayan (1953)
Pista ng Caltex (1953)
Ryan Ryan Musikahan (1988–1995)
Sa Linggo nAPO Sila (1989–1995)
Sabado Live! (1998–1999)
'Sang Linggo nAPO Sila (1995–1998)
Sarah G. Live (2012–2013)
Sharon (1998–2004, 2006–2010)
The Sharon Cuneta Show (1988–1997)
The Sharon Cuneta Specials (2011)
Small Brothers (1990–1991)
Stop, Look, & Listen (1968–1972)
Student Canteen (1958–1965)
Sunday Sweet Sunday (1966–1969)
Teen Pan Alley (1988)
Tonight with Dick and Carmi (1988–1991)
Tonight with Merce (1987)
Triple Treat (1986–1987)
Twelve O’ Clock on High (1972)
Wowowee (2005–2010)
Your Evening with Pilita (1964–1972)
Zsa Zsa (1987–1988)

Youth-oriented
9 Teeners (1966–1969)
Ang TV (1992–1997)
Ang TV 2 (2001)
D'Sensations (1970–1972)
Berks (2002–2004)
Buttercup (2003–2004)
Cyberkada (1998–2000)
Flames (1996–2002)
G-mik (1999–2002)
Gimik (1996–1999)
Goin' Bulilit (2005–2019)
Gokada Go! (2007)
Good Vibes (2011)
Growing Up (2011–2012)
K2BU (2002)
Kaybol: Ang Bagong TV (1997–1999)
Let's Go! (2006–2007)
One Cubed (2001–2005)
SCQ Reload (2004–2005)
Seasons of Love (2004–2005)
Shoutout! (2010–2011)
Star Magic Presents: Abt Ur Luv (2006–2008)
Star Magic Presents: Astigs (2008)
Tabing Ilog (1999–2003)

Religious 
The 700 Club Asia (2002–2006)
Ang Iglesia ni Cristo (1990–2003)
Bukang Liwayway (1986–1994)
Cathedral of Praise with David Sumrall (1986–1992)
Family Rosary Crusade (1987–2003)
Hour of Truth (1991–2000)
The Healing Eucharist (2006–2020)
Jesus I Trust in You!: The 3:00 pm Prayer Habit (1986–2002)
Kapamilya Daily Mass (2020)
Kape't Pandasal (2004–2020)
Panalangin sa Ikatlo ng Hapon (2002–2020)
Powerline (1996–2002)
Sunday TV Mass (1990–2006)

Film and special presentation
ABS-CBN Presents
Action Cinema Presents
Action Sunday
Allied Film Cinema
Ang Hari: FPJ Da King (2018–2020)
Cine Fiesta
Cine Filipino
Cinema... Cinema... Cinema
Cinema FPJ: Da King On ABS-CBN (2007–2010)
Cinemagica
Cinerama 2
Chinese Movies
Daboy on ABS-CBN (2009)
English Movies
Evening Night Specials
Fiesta Filipino
FPJ Action Cinema
FPJ: Da King on ABS-CBN (2013–2014)
Friday Night Shockers
International Film Classics
Kapamilya Blockbusters (2010–2020)
Kapamilya Blockbusters: Sabado Thriller (2017–2018)
Kapamilya Cinema
Kapamilya Kiddie Blockbusters
Kapamilya Mega Blockbusters (2015–2018)
Kapamilya Weekend Specials  (2015–2016)
KB Family Weekend (2017–2020)
Kung-Fu Fight Night
Mega Sine
Mga Bituin ng Kahapon
Million Dollar Movies
Morning Movie Madness
Pinoy Movie Hits
Regal Presents
Sari-Saring Sine
Sabado Movie Greats
Sabado Movie Specials
Sabado Specials: Shake, Rattle and Roll (2013–2014)
Saturday Afternoon Blockbusters
Sine 2
Sine Natin Ito! (2013–2016)
Sine Parade
Sine Sa Dos
Star Blockbusters
Star Cinema Originals (2013)
Star Cinema Presents
Summer Kapamilya Blockbusters (2015)
Sunday Family Cinema
Sunday's Best (2006–2020)
Super Kapamilya Blockbusters (2019–2020)
Super Tagalog Movies
Super Tagalog Theater
Tagalog Movie Greats
Theatre Royale
Thursday Afternoon Movie
Viva Blockbusters
Weekend Movie Spectaculars

Others
Asia Business News (1994–1996)
Chinese Variety Show
Cinema... Cinema... Cinema (1999–2006)
Cinemascoop
Classified Ads On Television (1986–1992)
Gillette World Sport Special (1989–1994)
Home Video Guide
Mother Nature Presents
Movie Greats (1991–1996)
Movieparade (1986–1991)
Myx sa Dos (2002–2003)
O Shopping (2013–2020)
The Quantum Channel (1996–1998)
Saturday Shopping with Mr. and Ms.
Sky Mall (1998-1999)
Star Music Video (1995–2002)
Value Vision (1994–1996)
Video Hit Parade (1986–1992)
Video Hot Tracks (1986–1989)
Video Snack Preview

Acquired programming
Note: Titles are listed in alphabetical order, followed by the year of debut in parentheses.

Anime and Tokusatsu
Adventures of Tom Sawyer (1997; re-aired 2008, 2014–2015)
Air Gear (2007)
Akazukin Chacha (1999)
Alice Academy (2007)
Ang Alamat ni Snow White
Ang Mahiwagang Kuwintas
Ang Pangarap ni Cosette: Les Misérables (2009)
Angie Girl (2000; re-aired 2003, 2008)
Animazing Tales (2012–2013; re-aired 2014 and 2017, as a Holy Week special from Maundy Thursday to Black Saturday)
Angelic Layer (2005)
Anne of Green Gables (1998)
Astro Boy (2003–2004)
B't X (1997–1998)
Beet the Vandel Buster (2006–2007)
Beyblade (2002–2003)
Bikkuriman 2000
Bioman (1987–1988)
Blue Blink (1999)
Blue Dragon (2009–2013)
Bubu Chacha (2002)
Busou Renkin (2010)
Capeta (2007)
Cardcaptor Sakura (2001–2003)
Crush Gear Turbo (2003)
Crush Gear Nitro (2006)
Cedie, Ang Munting Prinsipe (1992; re-aired 2003, 2007, 2015)
Charlotte (1998)
Cinderella (1999, re-aired 2008)
Cooking Master Boy (2003; re-aired 2007)
Changeman (1988–1989)
Combattler V
CRO
Cuore
Cyborg 009 (2004)
D.I.C.E. (2006)
Daimos (1989–1990)
Dear Boys (2004)
Digimon Adventure 02 (2001–2002)
Digimon Adventures (2000–2001)
Digimon Frontier (2003–2004)
Digimon Savers
Digimon Tamers (2002–2003)
Digimon Xros Wars (2014)
Dinosaur King (2012)
Dragon Warrior (2002–2004)
Dog of Flanders: My Patrasche (1992–1993; re-aired 2015)
Duel Masters (2004)
El Hazard The Mysterious World (The Wonderers) (2001)
Eureka Seven (2007)
Eyeshield 21 (2007–2011)
Fantastic Children (2008)
Final Fantasy: Unlimited (2003)
Fiveman (1993–1994)
Flashman (1989–1990)
Fruits Basket (2004)
G-Force
Gash Bell! (2012)
Gate Keepers (2005)
Georgie (1998; re-aired 2011–2012)
GetBackers (2004–2005)
Gin Tama (2010–2013)
Gundam Seed (2004–2006)
Gundam Seed Destiny (2007)
Haikyu!! (2015)
Hamos, The Green Chariot (2001)
Hana Yori Dango (1999–2000; re-aired 2010)
Heavy Gear (2002–2003)
Heidi (1997)
Heroman (2012)
His and Her Circumstances (2005)
Hitman Reborn! (2009–2011)
Huck Finn
Inuyasha (2002)
Inazuma Eleven (season 1) (2011–2012; re-aired 2013)
Isami (1999)
Jackie (1999)
Janperson (1995-1996)
Jenny (2002)
Jester, the Adventurer (2000)
Jetman (1994–1995)
Judie Abott (2002; re-aired 2007)
Kerokerokeroppi
Kiba (2009)
Kiteretsu (1989–1991)
Koseidon (1991–1998)
Kuroko's Basketball (2013–2014)
Lady Lady (2003–2004)
Laserion (1987)
Law of Ueki (2007)
Little Women
Little Women II
Liveman (1991–1992)
Lost Universe (1999)
Machineman (1987–1991)
Magic Girls
Magic Knight Rayearth (1996–1997)
Magmaman (1990–1992)
MÄR: Marchen Awakens Romance (2009)
Marcelino Pan y Vino (1999, re-aired 2014)
Masked Rider Agito (2003–2004)
Masked Rider Kuuga (2002–2003)
Masked Rider Ryuki (2004–2005)
Maskman (1990-1991)
Master of Epic: The Animation Age (2010)
Marvel Anime
Iron Man (2011; re-aired 2013)
X-Men (1994–1996; re-aired 2013–2014)
Blade (2013–2014)
Wolverine (2014)
Mechander Robo (1987–1988)
Metal Fight Beyblade (2010–2014)
Mga Munting Pangarap ni Romeo (1997)
Mirmo Zibang! (2006)
My Hero Academia (season 1) (2019)
Nadia: The Secret of Blue Water
Naruto (2004–2008)
Naruto Shippuden (2008–2016)
Neon Genesis Evangelion (1999–2000)
Ninja Boy Rantaro
Nura: Rise of the Yokai Clan (2012)
One-Punch Man (2019)
Paul in Fantasy Land (1999)
Peter Pan
Pollyanna (1996)
Princess Resurrection (2010)
Princess Sarah (1993; re-aired 2002, 2007, 2014)
Project Arms (2003)
Ragnarok the Animation (2004–2005)
Rave (2003)
Remi: Nobody's Boy (1994)
Remi, Nobody's Girl (1999; re-aired 2004, 2007–2008, 2015)
Robin Hood (1998)
Saber Marionette J (1998–1999)
Sailor Moon (2012)
Sailor Moon R (2013)
Sakura Wars (2002)
Samurai X (1999–2000; re-aired 2002)
School Rumble (2007–2008)
Sgt. Keroro (season 1) (2007)
Sorcerer Hunters (1998–1999)
Shaider (1988–1991)
Sky Ranger Gavan (1987–1991)
Si Mary at Ang Lihim na Hardin (1996)
Soul Eater (2010)
Soul Hunter (2001)
Spielban (1989–1990)
Street Fighter
Street Fighter II V (2000)
Superbook
Super Doll Licca (2000)
Super Gals (2003)
Super Inggo at ang Super Tropa (2009–2010; re-aired 2010)
Superbook Classic (2014–2015)
Swiss Family Robinson (2000)
Tenchi-Muyo (1998–1999)
The Flying House (2015; re-aired 2016, as a Holy Week special on Good Friday)
Turboranger (1992–1993)
The Slayers (1997)
The Slayers Revolution (1997–1998; re-aired 2012)
The Three Musketeers (1997)
Thunder Jet (1997)
Tico and Friends (1997)
Tokyo Underground (2004)
Transformers (2009)
Transformers: Cybertron (2009)
Trapp Family Singers (1993)
UFO Baby (2002–2008)
Ultraman 
Ultraman Ace (1989–1996)
Ultraman Gaia (2001–2002)
Ultraman Max (2009)
Ultraman Mebius (2013–2014)
Ultraman X
Ultraman Orb
Voltes V (1987–1988)
Voltron
Wedding Peach (2000)
Yaiba (1999–2000)
Yakitate!! Japan (2006; re-aired 2013)
Yu-Gi-Oh! 5D's (season 1) (2012; re-aired 2014, incomplete re-run)
Yu-Gi-Oh! Duel Monsters (2003; re-aired 2014, incomplete re-run for only two weeks)
Yu-Gi-Oh! GX (season 1) (2006)
Yu-Gi-Oh! Zexal (season 1) (2013)
Zenki (1997)
Zoids: Genesis (2008–2009)
Zorro (1997)

Australian TV shows
A Dangerous Life (1988)
Round the Twist

British TV shows
Dempsey and Makepeace
Mr. Bean (1992–1996, 2006–2014)
Mr. Bean: The Animated Series (2006–2016)
The Worst Witch (2003)

Canadian TV shows
Black Hole High (2004–2005)
Incredible Story Studios

Cartoons and children shows
100 Deeds for Eddie McDowd (2003–2005)
The Adventures of Jimmy Neutron, Boy Genius (2012–2015)
The Adventures of Madeline
The Adventures of Super Mario Bros. 3
American Dragon: Jake Long (2007–2008)
The Archie Show
Are You Afraid of the Dark? (1992–1996)
Attack of the Killer Tomatoes
Avatar: The Legend of Aang (2010–2011; re-aired 2013–2014)
The Avengers: Earth's Mightiest Heroes (2011–2013)
Avengers Assemble (2014)
Bananas in Pyjamas (1995–1999, 2002–2006)
Barney & Friends (2005–2006)
Batman: The Animated Series
Bear in the Big Blue House
Blazing Dragons
Bucky O' Hare
The Bugs Bunny Show (1963–1972, 1986-1991)
Captain N: The Game Master
C.O.P.S.
Conan the Adventurer
Dora the Explorer (2010–2011)
Double Dragon
The Dreamstone
El Tigre: The Adventures of Manny Rivera (2012–2013)
Fairy Tale Police Department
The Fairytaler
Fantastic Four
FantomCat
Flipper and Lopaka
Franklin
G-Force
Garbage Pail Kids
Garfield and Friends
Go, Diego, Go! (2011–2012)
Godzilla
Godzilla: The Series
Huckleberry Hound
Hello Kitty
Hello Kitty's Furry Tale Theater (2007–2008)
Huntik: Secrets & Seekers (2010)
The Incredible Hulk (2012)
Inhumanoids (1986–1987)
Iris, The Happy Professor (1996–2002)
Jackie Chan Adventures
Jem and the Holograms
Julio at Julia, Kambal ng Tadhana (1994; re-aired 2007–2008)
Jumanji
Kassai and Leuk
Kidsongs (1988–1989)
Kim Possible (2006–2009)
The Krofft Supershow (1978)
Kung Fu Panda: Legends of Awesomeness (2013–2016; re-aired 2018)
Legendz: Tale of the Dragon Kings
The Legend of Korra (2013–2017)
Lilly the Witch (2008–2009)
Lilo & Stitch: The Series (2005–2006)
The Little Archies
Little Mouse on the Prairie
Little Rosey
Littlest Pet Shop
The Loud House (2017–2020)
M.A.S.K.
Maggie and the Ferocious Beast
Marvel Knights (2012)
Marvel Super Heroes
Captain America
The Incredible Hulk
The Invincible Iron Man
The Mighty Thor
Prince Namor the Sub-Mariner
Matty's Funday Funnies
Max Steel (2014–2015)
Maya & Miguel (2006–2007)
Mega Man
Men in Black
Merrie Melodies
Merry Morning Toons (2008; re-aired 2009)
Midnight Patrol
Mission Odyssey
Mona the Vampire (2008–2009)
Mortal Kombat
Mr. Bogus (1993–1995)
Mumble Bumble (2002–2005)
The New Adventures of Batman
Ni Hao, Kai-Lan (2012–2013)
Open Sesame
The Penguins of Madagascar (2011–2012)
Planet Sheen (2012–2013)
Pole Position
Popeye the Sailor
Rainbow Fish
The Real Ghostbusters (1987–1992)
Richie Rich
Rolie Polie Olie (2002–2004)
Round the Twist
SantApprentice (2009; re-aired 2014)
She-Ra: Princess of Power
The Simpsons (1990–1993)
Skyland
Space Sentinels
Spider-Man (2012)
Spider-Woman
SpongeBob SquarePants (2010–2020)
Star Wars: Droids
Star Wars: Ewoks
Street Fighter
Stuart Little
Super Mario World
The Super Mario Bros. Super Show!
The Super Hero Squad Show
The Telebugs
The Yogi Bear Show
The Addams Family (1973 TV series)
The Addams Family (1992 TV series)
Twinkle, the Dream Being 
T.U.F.F. Puppy (2014)
Teamo Supremo (2008–2009)
Teenage Mutant Ninja Turtles (2009–2010)
Teenage Mutant Ninja Turtles: Fast Forward (2009–2010)
Totally Spies (2005–2010)
Tom and Jerry (1966–1972; 1986–1988)
Tommy and Oscar
Trollz (2010)
Ultimate Spider-Man (2013)
Ulysses 31
Visionaries: Knights of the Magical Light
Voltron Force (2014)
What-a-Mess
Wild C.A.Ts
Winx Club (2006–2009)
Wolverine and the X-Men (2009)
Wunderkind Little Amadeus (2006–2007)
X-Men (2011–2012)
Yogi's Gang
Young Robin Hood

Korean dramas
 The Truth (2004)
 Four Sisters (2004)
 Sunshine of Love (2004)
 First Love (2004)
 Lovers in Paris (2004–2005)
 Save the Last Dance for Me (2005)
 Memories of Bali (2005)
 Stained Glass (2005)
 Oh Feel Young (2005)
 Green Rose (2005)
 Only You (2005–2006)
 Forbidden Love (2006)
 Spring Day (2006)
 Princess Lulu (2006)
 Wedding (2006)
 Wonderful Life (2006)
 My Girl (2006)
 A Love to Kill (2006)
 Princess Hours (2006–2007)
 Something About 1% (2007)
 Which Star Are You From (2007)
 Spring Waltz (2007–2008)
 Marrying a Millionaire (2008)
 Lovers (2008)
 Three Dads with One Mommy (2008)
 Boys Over Flowers (2009)
 He's Beautiful (2010)
 Perfect Match (2010–2011)
 Cinderella's Sister (2011)
 My Princess (2011)
 I Am Legend (2011)
 My Girlfriend is a Gumiho (2011)
 Marry Me, Mary! (2011)
 Pure Love (2011)
 My Fair Lady (2011)
 Three Brothers (2011–2012)
 Helena's Promise (2011)
 Heartstrings (2012)
 City Hunter (2012)
 Dream High (2012)
 Two Wives (2012–2013)
 Equator Man (2012)
 Secret Love: Sungkyunkwan Scandal (2012–2013)
 A Gentleman's Dignity (2012–2013)
 Rooftop Prince (2013)
 You're Still the One (2013)
 Ohlala Couple (2013)
 Glory Jane (2013)
 To the Beautiful You (2013)
 Missing You (2013)
 A Promise of a Thousand Days (2013)
 Love Rain (2013)
 That Winter, the Wind Blows (2013)
 The Love Story of Kang Chi (2013)
 Wish Upon a Star (2013)
 Crazy Love (2013–2014)
 When a Man Falls in Love (2013–2014)
 The Heirs (2014)
 Pretty Man (2014)
 Miss Ripley (2014)
 Angel Eyes (2014)
 Faith (2014–2015)
 Fated to Love You (2015)
 My Lovely Girl (2015)
 Let's Get Married (2015)
 My Love Donna (2016; cancelled)
 Love in the Moonlight (2017)
 Goblin (2017)
 Legend of the Blue Sea (2017)
 Weightlifting Fairy (2017)
 Hwarang (2017–2018)
 Black (2018)
 The King Is in Love (2018)
 I am Not a Robot (2018)
 W (2018)
 Doctor Crush (2018)
 Go Back Couple (2018)
 Hwayugi: A Korean Odyssey (2018)
 My Time with You (2018)
 What's Wrong with Secretary Kim (2018)
 Encounter (2019)
 Gangnam Beauty (2019)
 Code Name: Terrius (2019)
 100 Days My Prince (2019)
 I Have a Lover (2019–2020)
 Hotel del Luna (2019–2020)
 Touch Your Heart (2019–2020)
 Flower Crew: Dating Agency (2020)
 The Tale of Nokdu (2020)
 Love in Sadness (2020; cancelled)

Telenovelas
Ana Manuela (2014)
Artificial Beauty (2008)
Eco Moda (2002–2003)
El Cuerpo (2008)
Frijolito (2011)
Isabella (2004)
La Traicion (2008–2009)
Malparida (2011)
Pasión de Amor (2005–2006)
Precious Time (2008–2009)
Zorro: The Sword and the Rose (2007-2008)

Mexican
Alicia (2001–2002)
Alondra (1998–1999)
Ang Lihim ni Paulina (2000-2001)
Camila (2001)
Chabelita (1999–2000)
Cristina (2002–2003)
Daniela (2002–2003)
Daniela's Diary (2000–2001)
Dos Amores (2005–2006)
Inocente de ti (2006–2007)
Las Tontas (2008)
Lazos de Amor (1996–1997)
Little Amy (2005–2006)
Luisa (2003)
Maria de Jesus: Ang Anghel sa Lansangan (2009–2010)
Maria La del Barrio (1997-1998)
Maria Mercedes (1996–1997)
Marisol (1997–1998)
Mirada de mujer (2006)
Niño Felipin (2000–2001)
Nunca Te Olvidare (2002)
Paloma (2002–2003)
Por Ti (2003–2004)
Romantica (2003)
Rosalinda (2000)
Rubí (2005)
Tres mujeres (2001–2002)
Wheels of Love (2003)

Venezuelan
Altagracia (2003)
Gata Salvaje (2003–2005)
Ilusiones (1996–1997)
Kassandra (1998–1999)
Pura Sangre (2000–2001)
Solita Mi Amor (2003–2004)

American
24 (2003–2005)
26 Men (1960)
ALF (1987–1990)
Alias (2002)
American Chronicles
America's Top 10
Are You Afraid of the Dark?
Baywatch (1990–1996)
Beverly Hills, 90210 (1991–1996)
Bonanza (1960–1972)
The Days and Nights of Molly Dodd
Doogie Howser, M.D. (1990–1994)
The Doris Day Show (1969–1972)
Entertainment Tonight (1986–1996)
Family Ties (1987–1991)
The Famous Teddy Z (1990)
Father Knows Best
Free Spirit (1990)
Hard Time on Planet Earth
Highlander: The Series
The Highwayman (1988)
I Love Lucy
In the Heat of the Night
Inside Edition
The Invisible Man
It's a Living
Jane the Virgin (2016)
Lethal Weapon (2017)
Mad About You (1993–1996)
Man with a Camera (1961–1963)
Melrose Place (1993–1996)
Moonlighting (1987–1988)
Murphy Brown (1989–1995)
Mystic Knights of Tir Na Nog (2000–2001)
The Nanny (1994–1996)
Night Visions
Over My Dead Body (1991)
Perfect Strangers (1987–1991)
Power Rangers (1995–2000, 2004–2015)
Mighty Morphin Alien Rangers (1996–1997)
Mighty Morphin Power Rangers (1995–1996)
Power Rangers Dino Thunder (2005–2006)
Power Rangers in Space (1999–2000)
Power Rangers Jungle Fury (2009–2010)
Power Rangers Lightspeed Rescue (2001–2002)
Power Rangers Lost Galaxy (2000–2001)
Power Rangers Megaforce (2013–2014)
Power Rangers Mystic Force (2007–2008)
Power Rangers Ninja Storm (2004–2005)
Power Rangers Operation Overdrive (2008–2009)
Power Rangers RPM (2010–2011)
Power Rangers Samurai/Super Samurai (2012–2013)
Power Rangers Super Megaforce (2014–2015)
Power Rangers SPD (2006–2007)
Power Rangers Time Force (2002–2003)
Power Rangers Turbo (1998–1999)
Power Rangers Wild Force (2003–2004)
Power Rangers Zeo (1997–1998)
She's the Sheriff
Sledge Hammer!
Sound the Alarm
Sportsweek
Starman
Taken The Series
Tales from the Darkside
The Tracey Ullman Show
The Twilight Zone
The Young and the Restless (aired on ABS-CBN 1987–1989)
Twin Peaks
The United States and the Philippines: In Our Image (1989)
Young Hercules (2000–2001)

Regional programming

News
News Patrol North Luzon 
News Patrol Southern Tagalog 
News Patrol Bicol 
News Patrol Palawan 
News Patrol Panay 
News Patrol Negros 
News Patrol Central Visayas 
News Patrol Eastern Visayas 
News Patrol Chavacano 
News Patrol North Mindanao 
News Patrol Southern Mindanao 
News Patrol South Central Mindanao 
TV Patrol North Luzon  (2018–2020)
TV Patrol Southern Tagalog  (2009–2020)
TV Patrol Bicol  (2005–2020)
TV Patrol Palawan  (2011–2020)
TV Patrol Panay  (2011–2020)
TV Patrol Negros  (2007–2020)
TV Patrol Central Visayas  (2000–2020)
TV Patrol Eastern Visayas  (2018–2020)
TV Patrol Chavacano  (2000–2020)
TV Patrol North Mindanao  (2018–2020)
TV Patrol Southern Mindanao  (2005–2020)
TV Patrol South Central Mindanao  (2018–2020)

Morning show
Bagong Morning Kapamilya  (2018–2020)
Marhay na Aga Kapamilya  (2008–2020)
Maupay nga Aga Kapamilya  (2020)
Panay Sikat  (2018–2020)
Panay Sikat Sabado  
The Morning Show  (1995–2020)
Maayong Buntag Kapamilya  (2005–2020)
Maayong Buntag Kapamilya Sabado  
Pamahaw Espesyal  (2008–2020)
Maayong Buntag Mindanao  (1993–2020)
Maayong Buntag Mindanao Sabado 
Buenos Días Zamboanga  (2019–2020)
Magandang Umaga South Central Mindanao  (2010–2020)

Religious
Christ The Healer: Sunday TV Mass 
The Banquet of Love: Sunday TV Mass

Others
Agri Tayo Dito (2012–2018)
Alas Onse Y Medya
Amor Chicko
Ang TV Bacolod
Ang TV Cebu
Ang TV Davao
Ano Ngani?
Arangkada
Awitanghalan
Bagong Umaga, Bagong Balita (2012–2018)
Baguio Diaries
Banay ni Iyo Karpyo (1969–1970) - ABS-CBN Cebu
Barkadahan sa S na S
Batangas News Patrol (2008–2009)
Bida Kapampangan (2011–2017)
Carol En Cosme (1996–1997)
Dateline Northern Luzon
Derecho
For Life Presents
Game Na!
Gikan sa Masa, Para sa Masa - ABS-CBN Davao
Good Morning Philippines
Halo-Halo Sunday Special
Ini an Kabikolan
Isla (1997)
Kang Kinsa Isabwag ang Mga Bulak
Kapalaran (2002–2004)
Kapamilya, Mas Winner Ka! (formerly known as Kapamilya Winner Ka!; 2007–2018)
Kilig Bi-Kool
KSP: Kapamilya Sabado Party (2005–2007)
KTV: Kilig TV
Little Big Star Cebu
Little Big Star Davao
Mag TV Na (2008–2018)
MAG TV Na! 
MAG TV Na, Amiga! 
MAG TV Na, Asenso Ta! 
MAG TV Na, Atin To! 
MAG TV Na, De Aton Este! 
MAG TV Na, Oragon! 
Mag TV Na! Southern Mindanao
MAG TV Na, Waraynon! - ABS-CBN Tacloban 
Male n More
Midweek Report
Milyonaryong Mini (2006–2007)
Naimbag Nga Morning Kapamilya (2008–2018)
News Patrol Kapampangan (2018–2019)
Northern Catch
The Northern S.C.E.N.E.
Nuebe Patrol (2009–2014)
Okiddo (2005–2008)
PAL Newscast - ABS-CBN Cebu
Palawan TV Patrol (1997–2006) - ABS-CBN Palawan
Pamilya Ukay-Ukay (1996–1997)
Salandigan
SBD Jam (formerly known as Sabado Jam) (1997–2005)
Sabado Barkada (2003–2007)
Sabado Na Gyud
Sikat Ka! Iloilo (2006–2018)
Siya ug Ako sa Kangitngit
Summer Sunshine
Tsada
TV Patrol 4 (1988–1995) - ABS-CBN Bacolod
TV Patrol Bacolod (2001–2007)
TV Patrol Baguio (1995–2000)
TV Patrol Butuan (1999–2011)
TV Patrol Cagayan de Oro (1995–2001)
TV Patrol Cagayan Valley (2005–2018) - ABS-CBN Isabela
TV Patrol Caraga (2011–2018) - ABS-CBN Butuan
TV Patrol Cebu (1988–2000)
TV Patrol Central Mindanao (2005–2018) - ABS-CBN Cotabato
TV Patrol Chavacano (1995–2000)
TV Patrol Cotabato (1999–2005)
TV Patrol Dagupan (1999–2006)
TV Patrol Davao (1997–2001) - ABS-CBN Davao 
TV Patrol Dumaguete (1995–2005) - ABS-CBN Dumaguete
TV Patrol Iligan (1999–2006)
TV Patrol Ilocos (2008–2018) - ABS-CBN Laoag
TV Patrol Iloilo (2001–2011)
TV Patrol Isabela (1998–2004)
TV Patrol Laoag (1997–2008)
TV Patrol Legazpi (1997–2005)
TV Patrol Mindanao (1989–1997; 2001–2005) - ABS-CBN Davao
TV Patrol Morning Edition (1995–1998) - ABS-CBN Bacolod
TV Patrol Naga (1996–2005)
TV Patrol North Central Luzon (2006–2018) - ABS-CBN Dagupan
TV Patrol Northern Luzon (2000–2018) - ABS-CBN Baguio
TV Patrol Northern Mindanao (2001–2018) - ABS-CBN Cagayan de Oro
TV Patrol Northwestern Mindanao (2008–2009)
TV Patrol Pagadian (1995–2008)
TV Patrol Pampanga (2006–2018) - ABS-CBN Pampanga 
TV Patrol Socsksargen (2000–2018) - ABS-CBN General Santos
TV Patrol Tacloban (1997–2018) - ABS-CBN Tacloban
TV Patrol Tuguegarao (1997–2004)
TV Patrol Western Visayas (tandem with TV Patrol Negros (1995–2001) and TV Patrol Panay (1998–2001) - ABS-CBN Bacolod/Iloilo
TV Patrol Zamboanga (1995–2000)
Vote Alert (2019)
Zambo Jambo (1997–2005)

See also
 List of ABS-CBN specials aired
 List of programs broadcast by Kapamilya Channel 
 List of programs broadcast by A2Z (Philippine TV channel)

References

External links
 

ABS-CBN
Lists of television series by network
Philippine television-related lists